This list of education awards is an index to articles about notable awards in the field of education. These are faculty awards and teacher awards, and awards given to educational institutions, as opposed to awards given to students. The list also excludes science communication awards, which are covered by a separate list.

International

United Kingdom

United States

Other

See also

 Teacher award
 Lists of awards
 List of academic awards
 List of international literacy prizes
 List of science communication awards
 List of student awards
 :Category:Scholarships

References

 
Award
Education